The 2008 New Zealand general election was held on 8 November 2008 to determine the composition of the 49th New Zealand Parliament. The liberal-conservative National Party, headed by its parliamentary leader John Key, won the largest share of votes and seats, ending nine years of government by the social-democratic Labour Party, led by Helen Clark. Key announced a week later that he would lead a National minority government with confidence-and-supply support from the ACT, United Future and Māori parties. The Governor-General swore Key in as New Zealand's 38th Prime Minister on 19 November 2008. This marked the beginning of the Fifth National Government which governed for the next nine years, until the 2017 general election, when a government was formed between the Labour and New Zealand First parties, with support on confidence and supply by the Green Party.

The Green Party became the third-largest party in Parliament, with nine seats. The ACT Party came joint-fourth (in terms of seats), increasing their number of seats from two to five, and reversing some of their losses from the 2005 election. The Māori Party also won five seats – out of the seven Māori electorates – creating an overhang of two seats. The New Zealand First party, which had seven MPs in the previous parliament, failed to win any electorates or pass the 5 per cent MMP threshold, and therefore won no seats in the new parliament.

In his victory speech, John Key announced the readiness of the ACT, Maori Party and United Future parties to co-operate with the National Party to form the next government, the Fifth National Government of New Zealand. In her concession speech, Helen Clark announced her resignation as the parliamentary leader of the Labour Party. She had led the party since 1993, and had served as prime minister since the 1999 election. 2008 saw several important political figures enter Parliament, including future finance minister Grant Robertson, future National Party leader Simon Bridges, and the next two Labour Prime Ministers, Jacinda Ardern and Chris Hipkins. Former Labour minister Roger Douglas, who stepped down in 1990 returned to parliament in this election but as a member for the ACT Party.

Results 
The Labour government failed to secure a fourth consecutive term, after the National Party entered into support agreements with the ACT, United Future and Māori parties, resulting in a National minority government.

The Chief Electoral Officer released the official results on 22 November 2008.

Parliamentary parties 

| colspan=12 align=center| 
|- style="text-align:center;"
! colspan=2 rowspan=2 style="width:213px;" | Party
! Colspan=3 | Party vote
! Colspan=3 | Electorate vote
! Colspan=4 | Seats
|- style="text-align:center;"
! Votes
! %
! Change(pp)
! Votes
! %
! Change(pp)
! List
! Electorate
! Total
! +/-
|-
| 
| 1,053,398
| 44.93
| 5.83
| 1,072,024
| 46.60
| 6.22
| 17
| 41
| 58
| 10
|-
| 
| 796,880
| 33.99
| 7.11
| 810,238
| 35.22
| 5.13
| 22
| 21
| 43
| 7
|-
| 
| 157,613
| 6.72
| 1.42
| 129,584
| 5.63
| 1.51
| 9
| 0
| 9
| 3
|-
| 
| 85,496
| 3.65
| 2.14
| 68,852
| 2.99
| 1.02
| 4
| 1
| 5
| 3
|-
| 
| 55,980
| 2.39
| 0.27
| 76,836
| 3.34
| 0.02
| 0
| 5
| 5
| 1
|-
| 
| 21,241
| 0.91
| 0.25
| 25,981
| 1.13
| 0.51
| 0
| 1
| 1
| 
|-
| 
| 20,497
| 0.87
| 1.80
| 25,955
| 1.13
| 1.71
| 0
| 1
| 1
| 2
|-
| 

| 95,356
| 4.07
| 1.65
| 38,813
| 1.69
| 1.80
| 0
| 0
| 0
| 7
|-
| 
| 13,016
| 0.56
| new
| —
| —
| —
| 0
| 0
| 0
| new
|-
| 
| 12,755
| 0.54
| new
| 15,528
| 0.68
| new
| 0
| 0
| 0
| new
|-
| 
| 9,515
| 0.41
| 0.16
| 3,884
| 0.17
| 0.05
| 
| 0
| 0
| 
|-
| 
| 8,640
| 0.37
| new
| 9,714
| 0.42
| new
| 0
| 0
| 0
| new
|-
| 
| 8,176
| 0.35
| new
| 9,214
| 0.40
| new
| 0
| 0
| 0
| new
|-
| 
| 1,909
| 0.08
| 0.01
| 1,885
| 0.08
| 0.01
| 0
| 0
| 0
| 
|-
| 
| 1,208
| 0.05
| 
| 1,758
| 0.08
| 0.05
| 0
| 0
| 0
| 
|-
|
| 1,176
| 0.05
| 0.01
| 1,739
| 0.08
| 0.05
| 0
| 0
| 0
| 
|-
| 
| 932
| 0.04
| new
| 480
| 0.02
| new
| 0
| 0
| 0
| new
|-
| 
| 465
| 0.02
| new
| 1,213
| 0.05
| new
| 
| 0
| 0
| new
|-
| 
| 313
| 0.01
| new
| 192
| 0.01
| new
| 
| 0
| 0
| new
|-
| style="background-color:#ffffff" |
| style="text-align:left;" |Unregistered parties
| —
| —
| —
| 1,363
| 0.06
| 0.01
| 
| 0
| 0
| 
|-
| 
| —
| —
| —
| 5,013
| 0.53
| 0.31
| 0
| -
| 0
| 
|-
! colspan=2 style="text-align:left;" | Valid votes
! 2,344,566
! 98.66
! 0.11
! 2,300,266
! 96.79
! 0.2
! Colspan=4 |
|-
| colspan=2 style="text-align:left;" | Informal vote
| 11,970
| 0.50
| 0.04
| 25,332
| 1.07
| 0.01
| Colspan=4 |
|-
| colspan=2 style="text-align:left;" | Disallowed votes
| 19,944
| 0.84
| 0.07
| 50,882
| 2.14
| 0.26
| Colspan=4 |
|-
| colspan=2 style="text-align:left;" | Below electoral threshold
| 153,461
| 6.46
| 
| —
| —
| —
| Colspan=4 |
|-
! colspan=2 style="text-align:left;" | Total
! 2,376,480
! 100
!
! 2,376,480
! 100
!
! 52
! 70
! 122
! 1
|-
| colspan=2 style="text-align:left;" | Eligible voters and Turnout
| 2,990,759
| 79.46
| 1.46
| 2,990,759
| 79.46
| 1.46
| Colspan=4 |
|}

Votes summary

Electorate results 

While the National Party has dominated rural seats since 1938, it achieved a clean sweep this year. The 19 general electorates which Labour retained all have a predominantly urban character, excluding Waimakariri, a predominantly urban area but with a significant rural population, resulting in a Labour MP narrowly elected but National winning the party vote commandingly. Palmerston North remains the only provincial city with a Labour MP. The two seats of Hamilton (considered "bellwether" seats as their demographic profile closely resembles that of the country as a whole) both went to National.

The table below shows the results of the 2008 general election:

Key:

|-
|colspan=8 style="background-color:#EEEEEE;text-align:center;"| Māori Electorates
|-

|}

List results

Unsuccessful list candidates

Notes
 Party list members resigned during the parliamentary term.
 Originally unsuccessful party list members declared elected to parliament when elected list MPs resigned.

Dates 
New Zealand elections traditionally occur after September in the third year following the last election, and snap elections occur rarely; the only three elections out of sync in the period of 1948 to 2008 took place in 1951, 1984 and 2002—and the last two came only a few months early. Convention in New Zealand expects Parliaments to run for a full three years unless the government loses the confidence of the House, although this has not happened since 1911.

The Constitution Act 1986 defines the term of Parliament as "three years from the day fixed for the return of the writs issued for the last preceding general election of members of the House of Representatives, and no longer". Since the writs for the 2005 election were returned on 6 October 2005,
the ensuing 48th New Zealand Parliament expired on 6 October 2008, making 15 November the final possible date for the 2008 general election.

On Friday 12 September 2008, Prime Minister Helen Clark announced that the general election would take place on 8 November 2008. This set the full election timetable as:
 Dissolution of parliament – Friday, 3 October 2008.
 Writ day – Wednesday, 8 October.
 Nominations day – Tuesday, 14 October.
 Election day – Saturday, 8 November.
 Official results declared and writs returned by Saturday, 22 November.
 The 49th Parliament must convene no later than Saturday 3 January 2009.

Political parties

Contesting parties 

Nineteen registered political parties contested the party vote:

Non-contesting parties 

The following parties either disappeared during the previous parliament's term (2005 to 2008), or did not contest the 2008 elections for other reasons.

Retiring MPs 

In the months preceding the election 13 Members of Parliament announced that they would not seek re-election to the House of Representatives in 2008, namely:
 from Labour, 9 members:
 Tim Barnett (Christchurch Central)
 David Benson-Pope (Dunedin South)
 Mark Gosche (Maungakiekie)
 Marian Hobbs
 Steve Maharey (Palmerston North)
 Jill Pettis (list MP)
 Dover Samuels (list MP)
 Paul Swain (Rimutaka)
 Margaret Wilson (list MP)
 from National, 4 members:
 Mark Blumsky (list MP)
 Bob Clarkson (Tauranga)
 Katherine Rich (list MP)
 Clem Simich (list MP)

Several list MPs elected in 2005 resigned before the end of the term; for a full list, see 48th New Zealand Parliament#Changes during term.

MPs who lost their seats

New Zealand First 
New Zealand First received 4.07% of the party vote – below the threshold of 5% – and failed to win an electorate seat. The party's seven MPs lost their seats:
 Winston Peters Leader, and second in Tauranga by 11,742 votes
 Peter Brown 2nd on List and Deputy Leader
 Ron Mark (list MP; 3rd in Rimutaka)
 Doug Woolerton (list MP)
 Barbara Stewart (list MP)
 Pita Paraone (list MP)
 Dail Jones (list MP at number 14)

United Future Party 
 Judy Turner (list MP)

Labour Party 
 Damien O'Connor (MP for West Coast-Tasman)
 Dave Hereora (list MP)
 Harry Duynhoven (MP for New Plymouth)
 Judith Tizard (MP for Auckland Central)
 Lesley Soper (list MP)
 Louisa Wall (list MP)
 Mahara Okeroa (MP for Te Tai Tonga)
 Mark Burton (MP for Taupo)
 Martin Gallagher MP for Hamilton West)
 Russell Fairbrother (list MP; MP for Napier from 2002 to 2005)

Independents 
 Gordon Copeland (list MP)
 Taito Phillip Field (MP for Mangere)

Voter enrolment and turnout 

The rolls listed almost 3 million people registered to vote in the election, a record number representing 95.3% of the estimated eligible voting population.
In contrast, voter turnout of 79.5% of enrolled voters came in lower than in most previous elections, the second-lowest since 1978 (when a large number of outdated and duplicate enrolments deflated the figure) and third-lowest since 1902.

Turnout statistics reflect the percentage of those enrolled to vote.

Political scientist Stephen Levine from Victoria University speculated that the low turnout may have resulted from the National Party's large lead over Labour in opinion polls running up to the election.
Māori Party co-leader Pita Sharples expressed concern that only 55% of those on the Maori roll had voted.

Issues

Electoral Finance Act 

The Electoral Finance Act 2007 passed by the Labour government had a "chilling effect" on political activity in 2008, according to the Electoral Commission.
Some parties attempted to make this an election issue.

Economic conditions 
On 5 August 2008, the Treasury announced that the New Zealand economy had entered a recession.
Economic downturn has led to high-profile job losses, such as the closure of factories in Foxton,
in west Dunedin
and in southern Hawke's Bay.
At the same time, inflation hit an eighteen-year high,
with an upwards tug on the prices of basics such as food and petrol, the latter crossing the two-dollar-per-litre mark in late May.

At the Labour Party's campaign launch on 12 October 2008, Helen Clark became the latest world leader to guarantee bank deposits, unveiling a plan worth $150 billion whereby all retail deposits would be unconditionally covered. The plan would be voluntary to join; within two days, reports appeared stating that all of New Zealand's major trading banks had signed up. Also signed up to the plan was the National Party, with deputy leader and finance spokesperson Bill English saying that there was "still time to change the...scheme if banks find it hard to borrow overseas".

Taxation 

On 6 October, two days before the National Party's scheduled release of details of the tax-cut plan it had over and above the governing coalition's three-stage series of tax cuts revealed in the 2008 Budget,
the Government disclosed its full fiscal situation; it showed that it expected to take $3.1 billion less tax in 2009, forcing the government to borrow $5.9 billion in 2009, rising to $7.3 billion by 2013. This implied higher costs for KiwiSaver, Working For Families and the 20 hours subsidised early-childhood plan; and higher numbers of people forced onto benefits by any prospective economic downturn. Over the next fiscal year, Dr Cullen expected GDP to rise by just 0.1%, with median house prices dropping by an estimated 10–15%.

John Key responded to the news by describing the numbers as "a bit worse than we had anticipated", and stated "I'm confident we can deliver a programme of tax cuts."
The same day Helen Clark reiterated her opinion on tax cuts beyond the government's proposal, saying "now is not the time to go out and recklessly borrow to offer tax cuts",
an opinion she had first voiced in early August
when the National Party used its annual conference to promise to speed up the implementation of the tax cuts, and to borrow several billion dollars to fund infrastructure projects such as a $1.5 billion broadband plan and a new prison in its first term.
On 9 October, National released its policy, promising people on the average wage or higher around $47 a week extra in the hand, funded through a combination of cutting contributions to KiwiSaver, eliminating a tax credit for science and development, and changing Working For Families entitlements.

Trust 

On calling the 2008 election, Prime Minister Helen Clark declared that it would be "about trust", labelling the National Party's recent commitments to preserve Labour Party programmes such as KiwiSaver and Kiwibank as "insincere".

Members of the Labour Party accused John Key of lying about his shareholding in Tranz Rail, by not disclosing nearly half of the shares he and his family trusts owned in the company, even though this presented a clear conflict of interest with Key's role as his party's spokesperson on transport, at a time when he asked several questions in the House about the government's plans regarding rail infrastructure.

New Zealand First leader Winston Peters faced an attack on his party's credibility, first over allegations that his party did not declare a $100,000 donation from millionaire ex-patriate property developer Owen Glenn to cover Winston Peters' legal costs in a challenge to the result in the seat of Tauranga.  This was referred to a House of Representatives Privileges Committee. On 22 September, the committee determined that Peters had "provided misleading information" and recommended he be censured; this was done by the House of Representatives in a 62–56 vote two days later. The second allegation revolved around the party's failure to declare the use of a secret trust to funnel large donations into New Zealand First's bank account, even though no donations over $10,000 to New Zealand First has been declared, as the law requires. This case was referred to the Serious Fraud Office for further investigation; on 11 October, New Zealand First was cleared of charges that Peters called a "waste of time" and on 24 October, New Zealand First was cleared of wrongdoing by the Electoral Commission, which was investigating donations that the party failed to declare.

Electorates

Boundary changes 

The Representation Commission altered many of the boundaries of New Zealand's parliamentary electorates following the 2006 census; the large growth in population between censuses lead to significant boundary changes, particularly in Auckland, the area around Christchurch and the central North Island. In May 2007, the Representation Commission announced the boundary changes
to take effect for the next general election, with the boundaries finalised in September 2007.

The Commission announced the formation of a new electorate in Greater Auckland, bringing the number of geographical constituencies to 70. The new seat, originally dubbed "Howick" (after the Auckland suburb), would have included parts of the existing Pakuranga, Manukau East and Clevedon electorates. After Pakuranga electors made strong objections to the proposed changes (which would have seen the inclusion of the population centres Panmure, Point England and Glen Innes into the electorate) the Commission largely reverted proposed changes to the boundaries of the Pakuranga electorate. The Commission opted to alleviate population pressures by moving the Auckland City suburb of Otahuhu into Manukau East. The revised new seat received the name "Botany" to reflect its focus on the growing population-centres of Botany Downs–Dannemora. On paper, Botany counts as a safe National seat.

Even though the number of South Island electorates remains fixed, the decline in the population of electorates south of Christchurch has resulted in the boundaries of electorates from Invercargill north to Rakaia shifting northwards. The seats of Aoraki, Otago, Rakaia and Banks Peninsula all gravitated towards Christchurch. In the process:
 Aoraki received the new name of Rangitata
 Otago received the new name of Waitaki
 Rakaia received the new name of Selwyn
 Banks Peninsula received the new name of Port Hills

Other seats in the lower South Island increased dramatically in size.

Situation after 2005 

In 2005 four MPs won seats with majorities of under a thousand: Labour's Darren Hughes beat National candidate Nathan Guy in Ōtaki by 382 votes (1.00%), and in Hamilton West, Martin Gallagher of the Labour Party won an 825-vote majority (2.46%) over National's Tim Macindoe. Both these seats saw a rematch in 2008, with the National Party candidates emerging victorious in each.

The swing to National in the central North Island saw two Bay of Plenty seats produce close results: in Rotorua, the sitting Labour MP Steve Chadwick prevailed by just 662 votes (2.17%) over National's Gil Stehbens, and in Tauranga, property developer Bob Clarkson defeated New Zealand First's leader and seven-term MP for Tauranga Winston Peters by 730 votes (2.02%). Rotorua fell to National's Todd McClay in 2008, while Simon Bridges held Tauranga for National by a wide margin, preventing Peters from returning to Parliament.

Besides the three Labour-held narrow-margin seats mentioned above (Otaki, Hamilton West and Rotorua), National had prospects of gaining Taupō, where boundary changes have added the National-leaning town of Cambridge and with it nearly 20,000 different voters – putting sitting MP Mark Burton's 2005 majority of just 1,285 votes (4.43%) at risk. Similarly, the seat of West Coast-Tasman gave Labour's Damien O'Connor a majority of 2,154 (6.77%). National reversed all of these majorities in 2008 and captured all three seats.

Part of National's core vote comes from provincial centres. In 1990, when Labour lost power, it lost every seat between the southern fringe of the Auckland urban area and Porirua except Napier and Palmerston North; in 2005, National again won several provincial seats off Labour:

 East Coast
 Tukituki
 Napier
 Whanganui
 Hamilton East
 Otago
 Aoraki

National also won Tauranga off New Zealand First leader Winston Peters in 2005 and the lion's share of the ACT and United parties' core votes (and in the process gained Northcote off Labour).

The newly-drawn seat of Botany on Auckland's eastern fringe presented an electoral problem for the Labour Party – on 4 July 2008 a crowd of mostly Asian marchers numbered in the thousands protested against Labour's record on crime and sentencing and a perceived upswing in anti-Asian crime. Because of the large Asian population in the new seat, such trends may have given National candidate and victor Pansy Wong a possible advantage. Boundary changes have also shaken up the electoral landscape of the South Island. Three new seats – Selwyn, Waitaki and Rangitata, drawn respectively out of Aoraki, Otago and Rakaia, three National-held seats in 2005, damaged Labour's chances outside of Christchurch and Dunedin.

On Labour's other flank, the three Māori electorates that it held last time against a strong Māori Party challenge were in danger of falling as they did in 1996 when New Zealand First broke Labour's sixty-year stranglehold. Nanaia Mahuta again faced Angeline Greensill for the new Hauraki-Waikato seat, and narrowly held it. Māori Affairs Minister Parekura Horomia also held on by a small margin against veteran broadcaster Derek Fox in Ikaroa-Rāwhiti. Incumbent Mahara Okeroa, however, was defeated by Rahui Katene in Te Tai Tonga, giving the Māori Party an additional seat.

The seats of Tauranga and Epsom provided particular resonances: Winston Peters failed to retake the marginal Tauranga (and Ron Mark failed to win the Rimutaka seat), meaning New Zealand First's chances of returning to the House depended on winning 5% of the party vote, which they did not accomplish. Similarly, the electoral fortunes of the ACT Party depended very largely on Rodney Hide retaining Epsom, which he did.

Amongst other parties very aware of the 5% barrier, United Future appeared more secure in the light of Peter Dunne's grip on Ōhariu, which he maintained, though by a narrower margin than previously; and the Progressive Party retained a very strong hold via Jim Anderton's "safe seat" of Wigram.

The Greens never appeared in danger of slipping below the 5% threshold, although lacking an obvious winnable electorate seat (co-leader Jeanette Fitzsimons had won Coromandel in 1999, but the electorate returned to National in 2002).

Seats that changed hands 
National won nine electorate seats from Labour:
 Auckland Central: Nikki Kaye defeated sitting Labour MP Judith Tizard, the first time National has won this seat.
 Hamilton West: won by Tim Macindoe who ousted sitting Labour MP Martin Gallagher, a reversal of the 2005 election when Gallagher narrowly defeated Macindoe.
 Maungakiekie: Sam Lotu-Iiga achieved a majority of 1,876 over Carol Beaumont after incumbent Mark Gosche retired. Beaumont entered Parliament as a Labour list member.
 New Plymouth: the most marginal electorate, where Jonathan Young won by 314 votes to oust Harry Duynhoven.
 Otaki: the most marginal 2005 seat fell to Nathan Guy, who defeated incumbent Minister Darren Hughes by 1,422 votes. Hughes remained in Parliament through the Labour list.
 Rotorua: fell to Todd McClay who defeated sitting Minister Steve Chadwick by 4,855 votes. Chadwick returned to Parliament through the party list.
 Taupo: won by Louise Upston, who defeated Mark Burton by nearly 6,000 votes, to reverse a 1,198 majority in 2005.
 Waitakere: Paula Bennett defeated Lynne Pillay by just over 600 votes, Pillay returned to Parliament as a List MP. This Waitakere seat differs from that previously held by National's Brian Neeson.
 West Coast-Tasman: Chris Auchinvole defeated Cabinet Minister Damien O'Connor.

The Māori Party also won a seat from Labour.
 Te Tai Tonga: Rahui Katene won the seat from Mahara Okeroa.

New seats won by incumbent MPs 
  National's Pansy Wong became the first Member for the new Botany seat. She had become the first Asian list MP in 1996, and in 2008 became the first Asian electorate MP.
  United Future's Peter Dunne, sitting MP for Ohariu-Belmont, returned to Parliament as the new Member for Ōhariu.
  National's Judith Collins, sitting MP for Clevedon, returned to Parliament as the new Member for Papakura.
  Labour's Ruth Dyson, sitting MP for Banks Peninsula, returned to Parliament as the new Member for Port Hills.
  National's Jo Goodhew, sitting MP for Aoraki, returned to Parliament as the new Member for Rangitata.
  National's Jacqui Dean, sitting MP for Otago, returned to Parliament as the new Member for Waitaki which takes in most of Dean's former Otago electorate, and Queenstown and Arrowtown.
  Labour's Nanaia Mahuta, sitting MP for the Maori electorate of Tainui, returned to Parliament as the new Member for Hauraki-Waikato.

New MPs in vacated seats 
A number of seats elected new MPs following the retirement of their sitting Members:
 Brendon Burns held for Labour Christchurch Central by just over 800 votes, previously held by retiring MP Tim Barnett.
 Clare Curran held for Labour Dunedin South vacated by David Benson-Pope who did not achieve party reselection.
 William Sio held for Labour the seat of Mangere, defeating Taito Phillip Field. Field won the seat in the 2005 general election, but left the party after being indicted on fraud charges and contested this election as leader of New Zealand Pacific Party.
 Iain Lees-Galloway held for Labour the seat of Palmerston North following the retirement of sitting MP Steve Maharey.
 Chris Hipkins held for Labour the seat of Rimutaka following the retirement of sitting MP Paul Swain.
 Amy Adams won for National the new seat of Selwyn, taking in part of the former Rakaia electorate. Sitting Rakaia MP Brian Connell retired from politics.
 Simon Bridges held for National the seat of Tauranga following the retirement of sitting MP Bob Clarkson.
 Grant Robertson held for Labour the seat of  following the retirement of sitting MP Marian Hobbs.

Opinion polling 

Having come first in the party vote at the 2005 election by just two percentage points, Labour held a slender lead in aggregate polling through the first half of 2006; a two-point lead in the first half of the year turned into a two-point deficit by May. Polling for a preferred Prime Minister showed Helen Clark nearly twice as popular as then National Party leader Don Brash.

Things changed in early 2007, with new National leader John Key improving on Brash's preferred Prime Minister rating by ten points, and overtaking Clark as preferred Prime Minister in May; at the same time National jumped out to a sizeable lead over Labour ranging from between eight and eighteen points, spending most of 2007 and 2008 with support from around fifty percent of the electorate. Labour's popularity slumped, hitting its lowest point in the winter of 2008, before beginning a slow climb into the high thirties in August and September.

Leading up to the election, polls indicated a range of possible outcomes on election day; some suggested Labour could form a coalition government, while others predicted National in control. Of the "minor" parties, only the Green Party consistently polled over the five-percent threshold, and United Future and the Progressive Party frequently failed to register a mention. Both ACT's and the Māori Party's popularity since 2005 remained steady at around two percent, while New Zealand First failed to poll over the threshold after December 2006. The polls gave varied results for preferred Prime Minister, with some giving Clark a slight lead, and others giving Key a sturdy margin.

Coalition preferences during the campaign 
The coalition preferences of various parties played a role during the campaign, due to the likelihood that no party would get an absolute majority of seats in the House. ACT emerged as the first "minor" party to announce that it would support a prospective National-led government. United Future also announced that it would side with National in late October, after supporting the Labour government for six years.

The Progressive Party, led by Jim Anderton, had served as a steady coalition partner to Labour and the electorate probably expected it to remain so. The Green Party, which abstained from opposing the Labour-led government in supply and confidence votes through the life of the 48th Parliament (2005 to 2008), said on 20 October that the only party of the two main parties it could form a coalition with was Labour. In the light of New Zealand First's run-in with the Serious Fraud Office, John Key ruled out that party as a government support partner on 31 August 2008, saying "the sheer weight of allegations and the actions of Mr Peters in the last few months means that I have lost that confidence in him".
At that time, Peters' future seemed under a cloud; after his party being cleared of charges of serious fraud, National restated its position, saying that the result of the case has not altered it.

Based on polls commissioned by the Māori news show Marae, the Māori Party appeared likely to win most of the Māori electorates and stood a chance of holding the balance of power. The party's MP for Te Tai Tokerau, Hone Harawira, stated at the end of September that the party could work with both Labour and National. On 28 September, National announced a commitment to abolish the Māori electorates in time for the 2014 election.
The Māori Party has benefited greatly from the Māori electorates, and its co-leader Tariana Turia was unimpressed: "They think again that they can deny us the right to participate. If they want a relationship with the Māori Party then very clearly they're starting off on the wrong foot". Marae polls released on 12 October showed 62 percent of voters polled in the two northernmost Māori electorates were resistant to the idea of a National–Māori government; co-leader Pita Sharples responded to the poll results by saying his party would be "stupid" to ignore the poll figures.

Candidates 
See:
 Candidates in the 2008 New Zealand general election by electorate
 Party lists in the 2008 New Zealand general election

See also 
 Elections in New Zealand
 Electoral system of New Zealand
 2008 in New Zealand

Notes

Further reading

External links 

 Official site for enrolments and for the Chief Electoral Office